audioOS (publicly called HomePod Software) is an operating system developed by Apple Inc. for its smart speakers, the HomePod and HomePod Mini. It was launched alongside the release of the original HomePod, released on February 9, 2018.

History
After the release of the HomePod's first update, iOS 11.3,  users complained online that the update had worsened their HomePod's bass and decreased its loudness, which was not alluded to in Apple's official release notes. Dwight Silverman of the Houston Chronicle agreed with these observations, though Apple denied that the update contained any updates to the HomePod's equalization settings.

The iOS 13.2 update had a bug which would brick HomePods if a system reset was attempted; Apple withdrew the update.

audioOS 14.1 added the Intercom feature.

In 2021, an Apple job listing referenced a non-existent "homeOS" operating system, echoing previous Bloomberg leaks about possible future Apple products for the living room that would merge the Apple TV and HomePod.

Features
audioOS's main user-facing features are AirPlay 2 and Siri.

Development
Though it was initially a fork of iOS, since version 13.4, it is a fork of tvOS. Software updates are installed automatically over-the-air, but can also be installed manually through the Home app.

While Apple publicly calls this OS "HomePod Software", the build manifest in .ipsw update files for the HomePod shows its name as "audioOS".

Version history

==See also==
 HomePod
 HomePod Mini
 Fuchsia (operating system), Google's equivalent for their Google Home lineup of smart speakers

References

External links
Apple's official release notes for HomePod updates

IOS
Apple Inc. operating systems
Proprietary operating systems
Streaming media systems